Saeed Poursamimi (Persian: سعید پورصمیمی, born February 29, 1944) is an Iranian actor. He has received various accolades, including three Crystal Simorgh for Best Supporting Actor, making him the only actor to have three wins in that category and two Hafez Awards. He is best known as the master of supporting roles in Iran.

Filmography

Film

Television

References

External links

1944 births
Living people
Iranian comedians
People from Tehran
Iranian male actors
Iranian male film actors
University of Tehran alumni
Iranian male television actors
Crystal Simorgh for Best Supporting Actor winners